Rémi Bonnet (born 3 March 1995) is a Swiss male ski mountaineer, mountain runner and sky runner, who won 2015 Skyrunner World Series in the Vertical Kilometer. He is also the winner of the 2018 Zegama-Aizkorri race.

Selected results

Skyrunning 
2015
 Champion, Skyrunner World Series (Vertical Kilometer)
 1st  The Rut 25K
 1st  Lantau 2 Peaks
 1st  Limone Extreme Vertical Kilometer

2017
 2nd  Dolomites Vertical Kilometer

References

External links
 Rémi Bonnet profile at Association of Road Racing Statisticians
 Rémi Bonnet profile at Red bull.com
 Rémi Bonnet web site

1995 births
Living people
Swiss sky runners
Swiss mountain runners
Swiss male ski mountaineers
Skyrunning World Championships winners
Male mountain runners